Young Lions, released in May 1990, is the fifth solo album by Adrian Belew, and his second on Atlantic Records. Released while Belew was acting as musical director and lead guitarist on the Sound+Vision Tour with David Bowie, the album features Bowie singing on two tracks ("Pretty Pink Rose" and "Gunman"), the latter of which Bowie and Belew co-wrote.

Two cover versions appear on the album: "Heartbeat", a song Belew had co-written and performed with King Crimson while he was a member; and "Not Alone Anymore", a Traveling Wilburys song from Traveling Wilburys Vol. 1. This was Belew's tribute to Roy Orbison who had recently passed. 

The other songwriting "collaboration" on the album is with Nashville radio evangelist Prophet Omega. Working decades-old tapes of Omega's broadcasts into "I Am What I Am", Belew, "listed him as a co-author, so in case a couple of hefty guys drop by my place some day, I can say 'here's your money.' " Al Kooper, who collects "oddball" recordings, gave a 47-minute recording of Omega preaching and Belew made two further recordings: "I Know What I Know" on Coming Attractions and "Troubles" on Side Three.

Belew was pressed for time for the cover artwork and it was hurriedly completed by Atlantic's art department. It features a then five-year-old Robert S. Belew on his way to Sunday school carrying a stuffed animal.

Track listing

All songs written by Adrian Belew unless noted:

 "Young Lions" – 3:48
 "Pretty Pink Rose" (David Bowie) – 4:44
 "Heartbeat" (Belew, Bill Bruford, Robert Fripp, Tony Levin) – 3:59
 "Looking for a U.F.O." – 3:36
 "I Am What I Am" (Belew, Prophet Omega) – 4:11
 "Not Alone Anymore" (Jeff Lynne, Tom Petty, George Harrison, Bob Dylan, Roy Orbison) – 3:13
 "Men in Helicopters" – 3:17
 "Small World" – 3:45
 "Phone Call from the Moon" – 3:38
 "Gunman" (music: Belew; lyrics: Bowie) – 3:51

Personnel

Musicians
 Adrian Belew – vocals, multi-instruments
 David Bowie – vocals (tracks 2, 10)
 Mike Barnett – string bass (track 9)
 Van Kampen – percussion ensemble (track 1)
 Ellen Gieles – percussion
 Dree Van Beeck – percussion
 Willem Van Kruysdijk – percussion
 Mies Wilbrink – percussion
 The Prophet Omega – spoken word (track 5)

Technical
 Adrian Belew – producer
 Ron Fajerstein – executive producer
 Justin Hertzman – executive producer
 Rich Denhart – engineer
 Michael White – engineer
 Dan Harjung – assistant engineer
 Ted Jensen – digital mastering, mastering
 Carol Bobolts – design
 Bob Defrin – art direction
 Sotto Vocé – cover art concept
 John M. Stevens – lettering
 Curtice Taylor – photo tinting

References

External links
Adrian Belew's website
Adrian Belew: The mind's turntable

Adrian Belew albums
1990 albums
Albums produced by Adrian Belew
Atlantic Records albums